Deniche Hill (born 11 March 2004) is a Bermudian professional footballer who plays as a forward for Leicester City.

Club career
Hill started his career with Hamilton Parish in his native Bermuda, before a move to England, where he went on trial with Huddersfield Town in 2019. He went on to join the Brooke House College the following year.

He was spotted by scouts from Premier League side Leicester City while representing Bermuda, and was invited to trial with the club in the summer of 2022. He signed his first contract with the club in December 2022, having featured in a number of games for the under-21 squad.

International career
Having represented Bermuda at under-20 level in qualification for the 2022 CONCACAF U-20 Championship, he was called up to the senior squad in January 2023. He made his debut in a 0–0 draw against Haiti in June 2022.

Personal life
Hill is the son of former Bermudian international footballer Corey Hill.

Career statistics

International

References

2004 births
Living people
Bermudian footballers
Bermuda youth international footballers
Bermuda international footballers
Association football midfielders
Association football fullbacks
Association football forwards
Leicester City F.C. players
Bermudian expatriate footballers
Bermudian expatriate sportspeople in England
Expatriate footballers in England